Mark Patterson (born 15 November 1966) is an Australian former cricketer. He played three first-class and four List A matches for New South Wales between 1994/95 and 1995/96.

See also
 List of New South Wales representative cricketers

References

External links
 

1966 births
Living people
Australian cricketers
New South Wales cricketers
People from Dubbo
Cricketers from New South Wales